Iceland has submitted films for the Academy Award for Best International Feature Film since 1981. The first film to be sent to AMPAS by Iceland was Land and Sons which was released in Iceland in 1980. Since then, Iceland has sent in a film every year.

Only one Icelandic film, Börn náttúrunnar (Children of Nature), directed by Friðrik Þór Friðriksson, has received a nomination for Best Foreign Language Film. However, a second, Djúpið (The Deep), made the nine-film shortlist in 2012, and a third, Síðasti bærinn (The Last Farm) by Rúnar Rúnarsson, was also nominated for Best Live Action Short in 2006.

Friðrik Þór Friðriksson's films have been selected to represent Iceland six times- more than any other Icelandic director. Ágúst Guðmundsson, Baltasar Kormákur and Hrafn Gunnlaugsson have each represented Iceland four times. In 1990, Guðný Halldórsdóttir became the first Icelandic woman to represent the country.

Submissions
The Academy of Motion Picture Arts and Sciences has invited the film industries of various countries to submit their best film for the Academy Award for Best Foreign Language Film since 1956. The Foreign Language Film Award Committee oversees the process and reviews all the submitted films. Following this, they vote via secret ballot to determine the five nominees for the award. Below is a list of the films that have been submitted by Iceland for review by the Academy for the award by year.

The Icelandic nominee is chosen annually in September by the Icelandic Film and Television Academy, which is also responsible for the Edda Awards. All films were primarily in Icelandic.

Notes

References

Iceland
Academy Award